A biobattery is an energy storing device that is powered by organic compounds. Although the batteries are still being tested before being commercially sold, several research teams and engineers are working to further advance the development of these batteries.

Workings 
Like any battery, bio-batteries consist of an anode, cathode, separator, and electrolyte with each component layered on top of another. Anodes and cathodes are the positive and negative areas on a battery that allow electrons to flow in and out. The anode is located at the top of the battery and the cathode is located at the bottom of the battery. Anodes allow current to flow in from outside the battery, whereas cathodes allow current to flow out from the battery.

Between the anode and the cathode lies the electrolyte which contains a separator. The main function of the separator is to keep the cathode and anode separated, to avoid electrical short circuits. This system as a whole, allows for a flow of protons (H+) and electrons (e-) which ultimately generates electricity.

Sugar battery 

At the anode, the sugar is oxidized, producing both electrons and protons.

Glucose → Gluconolactone + 2H+ + 2e−

These electrons and protons now play an important role in the release of stored chemical energy. The electrons travel from the surface of the anode through an external circuit to get to the cathode. On the other hand, the protons are transferred via the electrolyte through the separator to the cathode side of the battery.

The cathode then carries out a reduction half-reaction, combining the protons and electrons with the addition of oxygen gas to produce water.

O2 + 4H+ + 4e− → 2H2O

Bacterial cultures 

There has been an interest in using bacteria to generate and store electricity. In 2013, researchers found that E. coli is a good candidate for a living biobattery because its metabolism may sufficiently convert glucose into energy thus produce electricity. Through the combination of differing genes it is possible to optimise efficient electrical production of the organism. Bacterial bio-batteries have great potential in that they can generate electricity rather than just storing it and also that they may contain less toxic or corrosive substances than hydrochloric acid, and sulfuric acid.

Another bacteria of interest is a newly discovered bacterium, Shewanella oneidensis, dubbed "electric bacteria", which can reduce toxic manganese ions and turn them into food. In the process it also generates electrical current, and this current is carried along tiny wires made of bacterial appendages called bacterial nano-wires. This network of bacteria and interconnected wires creates a vast bacterial biocircuit unlike anything previously known to science. Besides generating electricity it also has the ability to store electric charge.

In 2015, researchers showed that iron-oxidising and iron-reducing bacteria could load electrons onto and discharge electrons from nanoparticles of magnetite. In their research, co-cultures of iron-reducing and iron-oxidizing bacteria were exposed to simulated day-night cycles. When exposed to light, the phototrophic Fe(II)-oxidizing bacteria, Rhodopseudomonas palustris, were able to remove electrons from the magnetite thereby discharging it. In dark conditions, the anaerobic Fe(III)-reducing bacterium Geobacter sulfurreducens were able to reverse the process, putting electrons back onto the magnetite thereby recharging it. The researchers concluded that iron ions in magnetite minerals are bioavailable as electron sinks and electron sources under varying environmental conditions, and could effectively function as a naturally occurring battery.

Applications 
Although biobatteries are not ready for commercial sale, several research teams and engineers are working to further advance the development of these batteries. Sony has created a bio battery that gives an output power of 50 mW (milliwatts). This output is enough to power approximately one MP3 player. In the coming years, Sony plans to take bio batteries to market, starting with toys and devices that require a small amount of energy. Several other research facilities, such as Stanford and Northeastern, are also in the process of researching and experimenting with bio batteries as an alternative source of energy. Since there is glucose in human blood, some research facilities are also looking towards the medical benefits of bio-batteries and their possible functions in human bodies. Although this has yet to be further tested, research continues on the subject surrounding both the material/device and medical usage of bio-batteries.

Advantages 

Following are the advantages of biobatteries:
• It allows instant recharge compare to all the other batteries.
• These batteries keep themselves charged with the help of continuous supply of glucose or sugar. They do not require any external power supply.
• It can be made using readily available fuel.
• It has high energy density.
• It can be used easily at room temperature.
• The flexible paper prototype is used as implantable power source.
• They are used as clean alternate re-newable power source due to the fact that they are source of non-toxic and non-flammable fuel.
• They do not cause any explosions. Hence they are safe to use.
• They do not cause any leakage.

Disadvantages 
Compared to conventional batteries, such as lithium batteries, bio-batteries are less likely to retain most of their energy. This causes a problem when it comes to long term usage and storage of energy for these batteries. However, researchers are continuing to develop the battery in order to make it a more practical replacement for current batteries and sources of energy.

See also

References

Works cited 

 
 
 

Energy storage